St Mary's Priory, Binham, or Binham Priory, is a ruined Benedictine priory located in the village of Binham in the English county of Norfolk. Today the nave of the much larger priory church has become the Church of St. Mary and the Holy Cross and is still used as a place of worship. The remains of the priory are in the care of English Heritage. The abbey's west face is the first example in England of gothic bar tracery, predating Westminster Abbey by a decade.

History

The priory was founded in the late 11th century, as a dependent house of St Albans Abbey, by Peter de Valognes and his wife Albreda. After the Norman Conquest, Peter was assigned lands in west and north Norfolk, among them the entire village of Binham. The priory was endowed with the entire manor of Binham, making the prior the lord of the manor, together with the tithes of thirteen other churches in Norfolk. Originally it had 8 monks, rising to 13 or 14 in the 14th century before falling back to 6 immediately before its suppression 1539. "Its history is one of almost continuous scandal." Many of its priors proved to be unscrupulous and irresponsible.

A Ley tunnel is said to run from the buildings to an unknown destination and it is reported that many years ago a fiddler decided to explore these passages; he could be heard for some distance before suddenly ceasing. The fiddler was never seen again.

Present day
The priory church continues to be used for parish services. As the priory was dedicated to Mary and the church to the Holy Cross, it is called The Priory Church of St Mary and the Holy Cross.

Burials
Peter de Valognes and wife Albreda de Saint-Saveur
Roger de Valognes (their son) and his wife Agnes FitzJohn

War Memorial
The war memorial for Binham is located in the grounds of Binham Priory. It takes the form of a stone Celtic cross and holds the following names for the First World War:
 Sergeant Bertie J. Fickling MM (d.1918), 10th Battalion, Essex Regiment
 Sergeant Thomas S. C. Youngman MM (1897-1916), 8th Battalion, Royal Norfolk Regiment
 Corporal Wallace E. Clark (1882-1916), Royal Army Service Corps
 Private Bertie Bunnett (1897-1916), 10th Battalion, Border Regiment
 Private Henry H. Wyer (d.1918), 1st Battalion, Royal Norfolk Regiment
 Private Edward E. Hooke (1895-1916), 2nd Battalion, Royal Norfolk Regiment
 Private Harry R. Neale (d.1917), 7th Battalion, Royal Norfolk Regiment
 Private Alec G. Curson (1896-1916), 8th Battalion, Royal Norfolk Regiment
 Private Herbert G. Grange (1896-1916), 8th Battalion, Royal Norfolk Regiment
 Private William H. Males (1895-1916), 8th Battalion, Royal Norfolk Regiment
 Private E. E. Coe (d.1915), 2nd Battalion, Yorkshire Regiment

And, the following for the Second World War:
 Sergeant Francis E. A. Rivett (1922-1943), No. 576 Squadron RAF
 Corporal Cecil R. Kendle (1920-1942), 5th Battalion, Royal Norfolk Regiment
 Gunner Reginald J. Manning (1907-1940), 5th Regiment, Royal Horse Artillery
 H. Baxter
 F. Taplin

See also
List of monastic houses in Norfolk
Walsingham Priory
List of monastic houses in England
List of English abbeys, priories and friaries serving as parish churches

References

External links

The Priory Church of St Mary and the Holy Cross
The Norfolk Archaeological Trust: Binham Priory
Norfolk Churches: Binham Priory

Benedictine monasteries in England
English Heritage sites in Norfolk
Monasteries in Norfolk
Christian monasteries established in the 11th century
11th-century establishments in England
1539 disestablishments in England
Grade I listed buildings in Norfolk
Monasteries dissolved under the English Reformation